The 2010 Levene Gouldin & Thompson Tennis Challenger was a professional tennis tournament played on outdoor hard courts. It was the seventeenth edition of the tournament which was part of the 2010 ATP Challenger Tour. It took place in Binghamton, New York, United States between 9 and 15 August 2010.

ATP entrants

Seeds

 Rankings are as of August 2, 2010.

Other entrants
The following players received wildcards into the singles main draw:
  Adam El Mihdawy
  Bradley Klahn
  Kei Nishikori
  Dmitry Tursunov

The following players received entry from the qualifying draw:
  Alex Bogomolov Jr.
  Adam Feeney
  Chris Guccione
  Dayne Kelly (as a Lucky Loser)
  Brydan Klein (as a Lucky Loser)
  Chris Klingemann
  Daniel Yoo (as a Lucky Loser)

Champions

Singles

 Kei Nishikori def.  Robert Kendrick, 6–3, 7–6(4)

Doubles

 Treat Conrad Huey /  Dominic Inglot def.  Scott Lipsky /  David Martin, 5–7, 7–6(2), [10–8]

External links
Official website
ITF search 
2010 Draws